Kocaman is a Turkish surname. Notable people with the surname include:

 Aykut Kocaman (born 1965), Turkish footballer
 Filiz Kocaman (born 1985), Turkish volleyball player

Turkish-language surnames